Adelidoria is a genus of planthoppers belonging to the family Flatidae.

The species of this genus are found in Sri Lanka.

Species:
 Adelidoria glauca (Kirby, 1891)

References

Flatidae